Maria is a municipality in Quebec, Canada.

History
Maria had been the location of a Mi'kmaq summer coastal community prior to European settlement. In 1774, the area began to be settled by American Loyalists, and Scottish and Irish settlers. In 1842, the geographic township was formed, named in honour of Lady Maria Howard, wife of Guy Carleton and third daughter of Thomas Howard, 2nd Earl of Effingham.

In 1845, the Township Municipality of Maria was established, dissolved, and re-established in 1855. In 1860, the place experienced rapid development when a group of Acadians arrived and founded the Parish of Sainte-Brigitte-de-Maria.

In 1977, Maria changed status from township municipality to just municipality.

Economics 
The main economy of the municipality is the hospital which serves the entire region.  The hospital of Maria was built between New Richmond and Carleton-sur-Mer.

Demographics

Notable people
Marie-Christine Lévesque, author

See also
 List of municipalities in Quebec

References

External links
, the official Municipalité de Maria web site

Municipalities in Quebec
Incorporated places in Gaspésie–Îles-de-la-Madeleine